Ash-Shūrā (al shūrā, "Council, Consultation") is the 42nd chapter (sūrah) of the Qur'an (Q42) with 53 verses (āyāt). Its title derives from the question of  "shūrā" (consultation) referred to in Verse 38. The term appears only once in the Quranic text (at Q42:38). It has no pre-Quranic antecedent.

Regarding the timing and contextual background of the  believed revelation  (asbāb al-nuzūl), it is an earlier "Meccan surah", which means it has been revealed in Mecca, rather than later in Medina.

Summary
1-2 The Almighty reveals his will to Muhammad
3 Angels intercede with God on behalf of sinful man
4 Muhammad not a steward over the idolaters
5 The Quran revealed in the Arabic language to warn Makkah
6-10 God the only helper, creator, and preserver, the all-knowing
11-13 Islam the religion of all the former prophets
14 Muhammad commanded to declare his faith in the Bible
15 Disputers with God shall be severely punished
16-17 God only knows the hour of the judgment
18-19 The Almighty will reward the righteous and the wicked according to their deeds
20 Sinners only spared through God’s forbearance
21-22 Rewards of the just and of the unjust
23 Muhammad charged with imposture
24-27 The sovereign God forgives and blesses whom he will
28-33 God’s power manifested in his works
34-41 A true believer’s character decided
42-45 The miserable fate of those whom God causes to err
46 Sinners exhorted to repent before it is too late
47 Muhammad only a preacher
48-49 God controls all things
50-51 Why God reveals himself by inspiration and through apostles
52-53 Muhammad himself ignorant of Islam until he had received the revelation of the Quran

Q42:23 Verse of affection

Q42:51 Revelation in Islam
In Islamic tradition, Quran 42:51 serves as the basis of understanding for Revelation in Islam (waḥy). 

"It is not fitting for a man that Allah should speak to him except by inspiration, or from behind a veil, or by the sending of a messenger to reveal, with Allah's permission, what Allah wills".

Based on this verse, Islamic scholars have described three ways in which God's revelation can reach His chosen individuals, especially prophets.  
An inspired message – not a word but an idea – can enter the heart of the chosen individuals either in the state of consciousness or in dream. 
The second mode, it is said, is the word heard by the person spoken to, as from behind a veil. 
In the third mode, the revelation is sent from God through archangels like Gabriel and is delivered to the prophets. It is the highest form of revelation, and Muslims believe the whole Quran was revealed in this mode.

References

External links
Quran 42 Clear Quran translation
Q42:1, 50+ translations, islamawakened.com

Shura